Jiří Novák and David Rikl were the defending champions, but the pair chose to compete at Cincinnati in the same week.

Lucas Arnold Ker and Mariano Hood won the title by defeating Petr Pála and Pavel Vízner 6–3, 6–2 in the final.

Seeds

Draw

Draw

References

External links
 Official results archive (ATP)
 Official results archive (ITF)

San Marino CEPU Open
1999 ATP Tour